Kentucky Route 3 (KY 3) is a  state highway in the U.S. state of Kentucky.

Route description
Kentucky Route 3 originates at a junction with U.S. Highway 23 west of Prestonsburg in Floyd County, Kentucky, United States. The route continues through Johnson, Martin and Lawrence counties to terminate at another junction with U.S. Highway 23 south of Catlettsburg in Boyd County.

From South Catlettsburg to Louisa it follows the original routing of U.S. 23.  It intersects KY-180, which parallels I-64, after . At this intersection, you turn right to stay on KY-3. The road continues   to the Lawrence County line.  In Lawrence County, it passes KY-1 and KY-1185, which takes you to Yatesville Lake.  It then continues into downtown Louisa toward Inez and on to Prestonsburg.

Major intersections

KY 3 Spur

Kentucky Route 3 Spur (KY 3 Spur) is a short  spur of KY 3 in Louisa running northeast to the West Virginia border at the Tug Fork of the Big Sandy River, where it continues into that state as West Virginia Route 37.

References

Further reading
 
 
 
 
 

0003
0003
0003
0003
0003
0003
U.S. Route 23